Just a Woman is a lost 1918 American silent drama film directed by Julius Steger based on a Broadway play, Just a Woman, by Eugene Walter. The film starred Charlotte Walker, then wife of playwright Walter.

The film was remade again in 1925 as Just a Woman with Claire Windsor.

Cast
Charlotte Walker as Anna Ward
Lee Baker as Jim Ward
Forrest Robinson as Judge Van Brink
Henry Carvill as John Prentiss
Edwin Stanley as Fred Howard
Anna Williams as Mary
Charles Kraus as Elias fox
Lorna Volare
Cornish Beck
Florence Deshon 
Camille Dalberg

Reception
Like many American films of the time, Just a Woman was subject to cuts by city and state film censorship boards. For example, the Chicago Board of Censors cut, in Reel 4, the embrace between the husband and woman after the intertitle "I hope to be back soon", and, Reel 6, the intertitle "I want the court to understand" etc.

References

External links

1918 films
American silent feature films
Lost American films
American films based on plays
American black-and-white films
Silent American drama films
1918 drama films
1918 lost films
Lost drama films
Censored films
1910s American films
1910s English-language films